Glenn R. Gibson is professor of food microbiology at the University of Reading. He co-coined the term prebiotics in a 1995 scientific paper. He received his PhD in 1986 from the University of Dundee for a thesis on the subject of "The ecology and physiology of sulphate-reducing bacteria in anaerobic marine and estuarine sediments".

Selected publications
Functional Foods: Concept to Product. CRC Press, Boca Raton, 2000. (edited with Christine M. Williams)
Handbook of Prebiotics. CRC Press, Boca Raton, 2008. (edited with Marcel Roberfroid)

References

External links
https://www.researchgate.net/scientific-contributions/38509365_Glenn_R_Gibson

Living people
Year of birth missing (living people)
British microbiologists
Alumni of the University of Dundee
Academics of the University of Reading